The following is a list of the monastic houses in Northamptonshire, England.

See also
 List of monastic houses in England

Notes

References

Medieval sites in England
Houses in Northamptonshire
History of Northamptonshire
Northamptonshire
Northamptonshire
Lists of buildings and structures in Northamptonshire